Women have flown and worked in outer space since almost the beginning of human spaceflight. A considerable number of women from a range of countries have worked in space, though overall women are still significantly less often chosen to go to space than men, and by June, 2020 constitute only 12% of all astronauts who have been to space. Yet, the proportion of women among space travelers is increasing substantially over time.

The first woman to fly in space was Soviet Valentina Tereshkova, aboard the Vostok 6 space capsule on June 16–19, 1963. Tereshkova was a textile-factory assembly worker, rather than a pilot like the male cosmonauts flying at the time, chosen for propaganda value, her devotion to the Communist Party, and her years of experience in sport parachuting, which she used on landing after ejecting from her capsule. Women were not qualified as space pilots and workers co-equal to their male counterparts until 1982. By October 2021, most of the 70 women who have been to space have been United States citizens, with missions on the Space Shuttle and on the International Space Station. Other countries (USSR, Canada, Japan, Russia, China, United Kingdom, France, South Korea, Italy) have flown one, two or three women in human spaceflight programs. Additionally one woman of dual Iranian-US citizenship has participated as a tourist on a US spaceflight.

Women face many of the same physical and psychological difficulties of spaceflight as men. Scientific studies generally show no particular adverse effect from short space missions. It has even been suggested by some that women might be better suited for longer space missions. Studies have continually indicated that the main obstacle for women to go to space remains gender discrimination.

History

Early Space Race struggle
In the competition between the Soviet Union (USSR) and the United States known as the Space Race, both nations chose their first space pilots (known as cosmonauts in the USSR and astronauts in the US) in the late 1950s and early 1960s from the ranks of their military high-speed jet test pilots, who were exclusively men.

In 1959 a group of thirteen female US pilots, dubbed by the American press as the "Mercury 13", wanted the chance to become astronauts and took and passed the health screening tests as the men, supervised by NASA staff. This was funded privately (e.g. by aviation pioneer Jacqueline Cochran) and not by the government; the idea of female astronauts faced a great deal of resistance in the military command and NASA, leaving these women no chance of becoming astronauts. Jerrie Cobb of the "Mercury 13" became a consultant to NASA in 1961 and testified before Congress in July 1962 about the "Mercury 13"'s positive medical results and gender discrimination.

Meanwhile, the USSR's director of cosmonaut training, Nikolai Kamanin, lobbied for having women as cosmonauts, after being inspired in 1961 by repeated questions from the foreign press about women in space. Subsequently, Kamanin crucially gained space program leader Sergey Korolev as a supporter, getting approval six months later for women cosmonauts. During a visit to the US in 1962 Kamanin got to know Jerrie Cobb of the then rejected "Mercury 13". At one point Kamanin noted in his diary, "We cannot allow that the first woman in space will be American. This would be an insult to the patriotic feelings of Soviet women." The Soviet government generally had no interest in using women as cosmonaut pilots, but Premier Nikita Khrushchev was extremely interested in the propaganda value of proving Soviet superiority over the US in women's equality. In February 1962 from over 400 applicants a group of five female cosmonauts were chosen to be trained for a solo spaceflight in a Vostok spacecraft.
To increase the odds of sending a Soviet woman into space first, the women cosmonauts began their training before the men.

First

The first woman to fly in space was Valentina Tereshkova, a textile factory worker who was an avid amateur parachutist, parachuting was necessary for the Earth landing which was made outside the reentry capsule. 
Tereshkova flew aboard Vostok 6 on June 16, 1963, completing a 70.8 hour flight making a total of 48 orbits before returning to Earth.

Kamanin framed her as "Gagarin in a skirt", and her marriage with Vostok 3 cosmonaut Andriyan Nikolayev on November 3, 1963, at the Moscow Wedding Palace, with Khrushchev presiding at the wedding party together with top government and space program leaders, was described by Kamanin as "probably useful for politics and science", giving birth on 8 June 1964, nearly one year after her space flight, to the first person with a mother and father who had both traveled into space, their daughter Elena Andrianovna Nikolaeva-Tereshkova.

After first
Kamanin hoped to fly two other women on the Voskhod 3 and 4 flights, despite the opposition of Yuri Gagarin and the other male cosmonauts. These plans were canceled in 1965, leaving the women with Soviet Air Force officer commissions.

The American Apollo program to land a man on the Moon included only male astronauts. Neither the USSR nor US launched another woman into space until women were admitted to the astronaut and cosmonaut corps in the late 1970s.

Later Space Race advances
By 1976, Actor Nichelle Nichols, who played Nyota Uhura in the Star Trek franchise, was using her public standing to speak against the exclusion of women and people of color from the US human spaceflight program. NASA decided that their next group of astronaut recruits would include women and people of color, and employed Nichols to assist in finding candidates.

On January 16, 1978, NASA announced the selection of its eighth group of astronaut candidates, which included the first women, six Mission specialists (not pilots): Anna L. Fisher, Shannon Lucid, Judith A. Resnik, Sally K. Ride, Margaret Rhea Seddon, and Kathryn D. Sullivan.

Similarly, in 1978 Tereshkova and her colleague Tatyana Kuznetsova pushed for a new cosmonaut program for women, with the USSR in July 1980 choosing a cosmonaut group which included nine women in addition to four men. The women were: Svetlana Savitskaya, Galina Amelkina, Yelena Dobrokvashina, Larisa Pozharskaya, Tamara Zakharova, Yekaterina Ivanova, Natalya Kuleshova, Irina Pronina, and Irina Latysheva.

Of the nine women only Savitskaya got to fly to space. As a research cosmonaut she flew aboard the Soyuz T-7 to the space station Salyut 7 in August 1982 and became the first woman to walk in space (extravehicular activity, EVA) outside the Salyut 7 space station on that mission.
Savitskaya became the first woman to fly in space twice, on the Soyuz T-12 mission on July 25, 1984.

Of NASA's first women astronaut group all flew in space at least once, with mission specialist Sally Ride becoming in 1983 the first US woman to fly in space, with the seventh Space Shuttle mission, and third woman altogether to fly in space.

Situation after the Space Race
Since the first American women in space most of the women who have been to space have been American women, outnumbering all other countries combined. But the more than 50 American women astronauts, contrasted by the several hundred astronauts who have entered space, women still only make up about 12% of all people who have gone to space, still being less chosen and enabled.

NASA only in 2013 enabled the first time an equal amount of women as part of an astronaut class, the NASA Astronaut Group 21, a short lived situation since the subsequently and current Group 22 has yet again a lower number.

Advances have been made during this time nevertheless.
In 1992 Mae Jemison became the first woman of color in space. Susan Helms became the first woman on an ISS expedition crew on Expedition 2, lasting from March 2001 until August 2001. Peggy Whitson became in 2007 the first woman to command the International Space Station, and in October 2009 NASA's first female Chief of the Astronaut Office.
On October 18, 2019, the first all female spacewalk was conducted by Jessica Meir and Christina Koch.

Future
Only 12 humans, all men and no women has ever walked on the Moon. In 2020, NASA's communication director reported that NASA planned to land astronauts on the Moon, including possibly a woman astronaut or astronauts, as part of the U.S. Artemis program. Of the 18 candidates in the Artemis program, nine are women: Nicole Aunapu Mann, Kayla Barron, Christina Koch, Kate Rubins, Stephanie Wilson, Jessica Meir, Jasmin Moghbeli, Anne McClain and Jessica Watkins. No astronaut has yet been assigned to any specific Artemis mission.

Discrimination
Space programs allowed women generally only well into the space age, with NASA opening its space program in 1976. When Sally Ride became  the first female US astronaut to go into space in 1983, the press asked her questions about her reproductive organs and whether she would cry if things went wrong on the job.

Women with children have also been faced with questions about how they would compare to traditional expectations of motherhood. Shannon Lucid, one of the first group of female US astronauts, remembers questions by the press on how her children would handle her being a mother in space. Women are often expected to be the ones mainly responsible for child-rearing, which can impact their career.

On July 20, 1969, American astronaut Neil Armstrong stepped off the lunar landing module Eagle, and stated, "That's one small step for man, one giant leap for mankind." Since then, no women have been able to access the moon.

According to the historian Kim McQuaid the American space agency NASA ignored gender issues at the beginning of the space era, and women were not normally allowed to enter technical schools or undergraduate/graduate training in engineering and the physical sciences until changes started happening in the end of the 1960s. Particularly in the period between 1972 and 1974 the focus on women became more prominent. In 1967, NASA changed its policy to make it easier for women to join and 17 women applied for the role to join a spacetravel mission, but all 17 job applications were declined. NASA did employ thousands of women in jobs were space travel was not included in the 1960s, but there was still hierarchical differences between women and men. The women employed in the space agency NASA are also still more likely to work in lower-ranked jobs, while men are more often employed in higher-ranked occupations, particularly in space crew settings, despite of women having similar qualifications to those of men. There has also been found a larger gender gap in certain jobs such as manufacturing, while downstream application and service jobs have a higher representation of women employees.

In 2023, numbers released by UNOOSA showed that only 11 percent of the world's astronauts are women, 6.6 percent are spacewalkers and 20 percent are in the space workforce. In March 2023, the Director of Space Technology of the Australian Space Agency, Katherine Bennell-Pegg, said that women are still in the minority in the space industry and that ‘STEM is for everyone’ whilst adding that inclusivity is important. The UN Sustainable Development Goals suggests that an increase of women being involved in the space industry is important to achieve the SDGs and gender equality, since 90 percent of future jobs will probably require STEM related skills. The promotion of space technology in an inclusive manner is also an important step towards achieving the SDG 5B. In 2022, the American astronaut Nicole Aunapu Mann, who studied mechanical engineering at Stanford University and also has military combat background in Iraq and Afghanistan, became the first Native American woman in space and she went on the International Space Station. On the 2023 International Women's Day, Mann stated that "inequality does stifle success" and that it is important to continue to break barriers and inspire and empower the youth to achieve their dreams.

In 1995, an academic journal stated that outer space occupations was regarded as a male dominated arena where the male body was the standard while the female body was seen as ‘contamination’ or uncertainty in an otherwise stable environment, and women have previously said that they have struggled to be taken seriously in outer space environments. Some women in the space industry have also reported that they feel like they have to express typically masculine traits like assertiveness and dominance in outer space occupations, since 'feminine' traits are looked down upon. For example, men are thought to be more rational, which is beneficial in the space industry, while femininity is associated with being emotional which is viewed as 'negative' in the context of outer space travel. The American scientist and former government official Carloyn Huntoon, has previously said in an interview in 2002 that if the women did not behave in the same way as the guys, it would mean that they were not doing the job properly.

Chris Pesterfield, a lecturer at the University of Bristol, has stated that legal and political changes have been made to allow for women to enter outer space occupations, but that these changes do not seem to have been as effective as one might have expected. Pesterfield has argued that the unequal amount of women and men in space might be an outcome of the socialisation process, starting already in child years. For example, boys are more often encouraged to have interests in STEM subjects such as technology and science than girls and there may be societal expectations that gender will influence what a person is good at. The OECD found that the majority of women employed by NASA have studied biological sciences (48 percent), while they are underrepresented in mathematics (25 percent), physical sciences (25 percent) and engineering (22 percent). Rebecca Spyke Keiser, who is a special assistant to the NASA administrator for innovation and public-private partnership, has stated that the lack of female role models in aerospace and physics might also have contributed to the low amount of women in space-related work as well as perceptions about women only being good at certain things.

There have been attempts at combating gender discrimination within the space sector. For example, the United Nations has made the Space4Women project which is intended to focus on gender related issues in space and find reasons why gender inequality is still an issue in the outer space sector. The project includes women from different backgrounds, professions and countries. One of the mentees in the programme stated that "working for girls and women in science has been empowering, encouraging me to persist in a work environment that is sometimes so hostile and not inclusive". In October 2017, UNOOSA and UN women also cooperated to organise a ‘Space for Women’ Expert Meeting with the goal of empowering women in space industry jobs. Commercial spaceflight and more focus on diversity are also factors that play a role in boosting participation by women.

Physical effects of space on women

Female astronauts are subject to the same general physical effects of space travel as men. These include physiological changes due to weightlessness such as loss of bone and muscle mass, health threats from cosmic rays, dangers due to vacuum and temperature, and psychological stress.

NASA reports initially argued that menstruation could pose serious health risks or have a negative effect on performance, although it is now dealt with as a matter of routine.

Since women have been sent to space, the previously male focused clothing has been reconsidered addressing the issues and needs for clothing like space suits for extravehicular activity (EVA) and bras, e.g. for exercise in micro-g environments.

Furthermore, space toilet designs did not have women in mind, until October 2020 when the first toilet with better design for women (as well as men) was delivered to the ISS.

Radiation and uterine and breast cancer
Both men and women are affected by radiation.
Massive particles are a concern for astronauts outside the earth's magnetic field who receive solar particles from solar proton events (SPE) and galactic cosmic rays from cosmic sources. These high-energy charged nuclei are blocked by Earth's magnetic field but pose a major health concern for astronauts traveling to the moon and to any distant location beyond the earth orbit. Evidence indicates past solar particle event (SPE) radiation levels that would have been lethal for unprotected astronauts.

However, due to the currently used risk models for endometrial, ovarian and breast cancer, women at NASA can currently only spend half as much time on missions as men, which limits their career options compared to men.

Astronauts on Apollo and Skylab missions received on average 1.2 mSv/day and 1.4 mSv/day respectively. Exposures on the ISS average 0.4 mSv per day (150 mSv per year), although frequent crew rotations minimize risk to individuals.
A trip to Mars with current technology might be related to measurements by the Mars Science Laboratory which for a 180-day journey estimated an exposure approximately 300 mSv, which would be  equivalent of 24 CAT scans or "15 times an annual radiation limit for a worker in a nuclear power plant".

Fertility
A study published in 2005 in the International Journal of Impotence Research reported that short-duration missions (no longer than nine days) did not affect "the ability of astronauts to conceive and bear healthy children to term."  In another experiment, the frog Xenopus laevis successfully ovulated in space.

Pregnancy
NASA has not permitted pregnant astronauts to fly in space, and there have been no pregnant women in space. However, various science experiments have dealt with some aspects of pregnancy.

For air travel, the United States' Federal Aviation Administration recommends a limit of 1 mSv total for a pregnancy, and no more than 0.5 mSv per month.

For fetus radiation increases the risk of childhood cancers.
Additionally children of female astronauts could be sterile if the astronaut were exposed to too much ionizing radiation during the later stages of a pregnancy. Ionizing radiation may destroy the egg cells of a female fetus inside a pregnant woman, rendering the offspring infertile even when grown.

While no human had gestated in space , scientists have conducted experiments on non-human mammalian gestation. Space missions that have studied "reproducing and growing mammals" include Kosmos 1129 and 1154, as the Shuttle missions STS-66, 70, 72, and 90. A Soviet experiment in 1983 showed that a rat that orbited while pregnant later gave birth to healthy babies; the babies were "thinner and weaker than their Earth-based counterparts and lagged behind a bit in their mental development," although the developing pups eventually caught up.

The lack of knowledge about pregnancy and birth control in micro-gravity has been noted in regards to conducting long-term space missions.

Post-natal
A 1998 Space Shuttle mission showed that rodent Rattus mothers were either not producing enough milk or not feeding their offspring in space. However, a later study on pregnant rats showed that the animals successfully gave birth and lactated normally.

To date no human children have been born in space; neither have children gone into space. Nevertheless, the idea of children in space is taken seriously enough that some have discussed how to write curriculum for children in space-colonizing families.

Fatalities

Four women have died during two spaceflight missions 1986 and 2003.

The first Teacher in Space Project (TISP) participant as payload specialist Christa McAuliffe, along with mission specialist Judith Resnik of STS-51-L died when their Space Shuttle Challenger exploded on January 28, 1986, less than two minutes after launch, along with all hands.

In February 2003, mission specialists Kalpana Chawla and Laurel Clark were killed on re-entry in the Space Shuttle Columbia disaster.

Statistics

Individual astronaut corps

American

The US has since the 1980s the largest group of women of all countries combined to have ever gone to space.

Sally Ride became the first American women in space, when she flew in June 1983 on the Space Shuttle mission STS-7 to space.

The first US woman to perform Extravehicular activity (EVA) was Kathryn D. Sullivan on the STS-41-G, which launched on October 11, 1984.

NASA's first female pilot was Eileen Collins from group 13, who first flew in February 1995 on STS-63 and became the first female US mission commander in July 1999 on STS-93.

Roscosmos

After the collapse of the Soviet Union in 1991, the Soviet space program was inherited by the Roscosmos state corporation, and has hosted two women. Originally chosen as cosmonaut during Soviet times, Yelena V. Kondakova became the first woman cosmonaut for the Russian Federation in 1994, and the first woman to travel for both the Soyuz program and on the Space Shuttle. Twenty years later, Yelena Serova became the first Russian woman cosmonaut to visit the International Space Station on September 26, 2014.

Russia's only current woman cosmonaut, Anna Kikina, was admitted to the Russian cosmonaut corps in 2012. In 2019 Roscosmos announced changes to their space suits to accommodate women and announced in 2020 that Kikina was selected for a flight to the International Space Station in 2022.

Canada

Roberta Bondar was the first Canadian woman to fly in space, on the Space Shuttle Discovery in January 1992.

The second Canadian woman astronaut is Julie Payette from Montreal. Payette was part of the crew of STS-96, on the Space Shuttle Discovery from May 27 to June 6, 1999. During the mission, the crew performed the first manual docking of the Shuttle to the International Space Station, and delivered four tons of logistics and supplies to the station. On Endeavour in 2009 for STS-127, Payette served as a mission specialist. Her main responsibility was to operate the Canadarm robotic arm from the space station. Payette was sworn in as the 29th Governor-General of Canada on October 2, 2017.

In July 2017, Dr. Jennifer Sidey-Gibbons was selected by the Canadian Space Agency to receive astronaut training at Johnson Space Center.  She completed the two-year Astronaut Candidate Training Program and obtained the official title of astronaut in January 2020.

Japan

In 1985, Chiaki Mukai was selected as one of three Japanese Payload Specialist candidates for the First Material Processing Test (Spacelab-J) that flew aboard STS-47 in 1992. She also served as a back-up payload specialist for the Neurolab (STS-90) mission. Mukai has logged over 566 hours in space. She flew aboard STS-65 in 1994 and STS-95 in 1998. She is the first Japanese and Asian woman to fly in space, and the first Japanese citizen to fly twice.

Naoko Yamazaki became the second Japanese woman to fly into space with her launch on April 5, 2010. Yamazaki entered space on the shuttle Discovery as part of mission STS-131.  She returned to Earth on April 20, 2010. Yamazaki worked on ISS hardware development projects in the 1990s. She is an aerospace engineer and also holds a master's degree in that field. She was selected for astronaut training in 1999 and was certified by 2001. She was a mission specialist on her 2010 space shuttle flight, and spent 362 hours in space.  Yamazaki worked on robotics and transitioned through the reorganization of Japanese spaceflight organization in 2003 when NASDA (National Space Development Agency) merged with ISAS (Institute of Space and Astronautical Science) and NAL (National Aerospace Laboratory of Japan).  The new organization was called JAXA (Japan Aerospace Exploration Agency).

European Space Agency (ESA)

The first Western European woman and British citizen flying to space was Helen Sharman in 1991, but she was not  sent by a state funded human spaceflight program, but as privately funded space flight participant of the Project Juno on a Soviet mission.

The first Western European and French woman sent by a state space agency CNES and ESA was Claudie Haigneré in 1996. Since then the only other woman sent by a European agency ASI and ESA has been Italian Samantha Cristoforetti launched on Soyuz TMA-15M in November 2014.

The 2022 European Space Agency Astronaut Group has specifically invited women to join. They also extended the first invitation to people with disabilities (parastronauts) to apply for the group.

China

In 2012, the Chinese space program sent their first woman Liu Yang to space aboard Shenzhou 9 to dock with Tiangong-1.

China's first female astronaut candidates, chosen in 2010 from the ranks of fighter pilots, were required to be married mothers. The Chinese stated that married women were "more physically and psychologically mature" and that the rule that they had have had children was because of concerns that spaceflight would harm their reproductive organs (including unreleased ova). The unknown nature of the effects of spaceflight on women was also noted. However, the director of the China Astronaut Centre has stated that marriage is a preference but not a strict limitation. Part of why they were so strict was because it was their first astronaut selection and they were trying be "extra cautious".  China's first woman astronaut, Liu Yang, was married but had no children at the time of her flight in June 2012.

Wang Yaping became the second Chinese female astronaut as a member of the Shenzhou 10 spaceship crew, which orbited the Earth in June 2013, and of the Tiangong-1 orbiting space station with which it docked. In 2021, Wang again flew on Shenzhou 13 where she became the first Chinese female astronaut to perform a spacewalk.

Other countries
Yi So-yeon, South Korea (2008, state funded as space flight participant with Roscosmos)
Jessica Meir, Sweden (2019, due to dual citizenship, though flown as US astronaut)

Women space tourists

After the second privately co-funded person overall and first woman Helen Sharman, Anousheh Ansari was the fourth overall privately funded space traveler, the first Iranian woman citizen (dual citizenship with the US) to go to space, as well as the first privately funded woman to fly to the International Space Station. She flew to the station in 2006 on the Soyuz TMA-9 spacecraft. Her mission launched from the Baikonur Cosmodrome on September 18, 2006. Soyuz TMA-9 transported two-thirds of ISS Expedition 14 to the space station along with Ansari. Ansari performed several experiments on behalf of the European Space Agency.

Space flight participant 

As the somewhat broader category of "space flight participants", four women have been classified: Helen Sharman, Claudie Haigneré (state funded), Anousheh Ansari, and Yi So-yeon (state funded).

After the first twelve US women, the third and last woman launched by the USSR was Helen Sharman in 1991, the first woman from Western Europe and the first who went to the space station Mir. She is the first United Kingdom woman citizen, making the United Kingdom the first of two countries (the other being South Korea) to have a woman as its first person to go to space. She was however not sent by the United Kingdom government, but by the privately funded Project Juno. As such, she was the second person and first woman to be funded privately to go to space. Vanessa O'Brien would carry the UN Women's flag on her sub-orbital spaceflight Blue Origin NS-22.

Commercial astronaut 

In 2019 Beth Moses became the first commercial astronaut woman to go to space (sub-orbital). Wally Funk, member of the Mercury 13, became the oldest woman in space when she flew on Blue Origin's New Shepherd flight on 20 July 2021. In addition to being the only member of the Mercury 13 to ever fly in space, she also broke the record for oldest person in space at the age of 82, though her record was broken by William Shatner in October that same year. On 16 September 2021, Sian Proctor and Hayley Arceneaux became the first female commercial astronauts to go into orbit on board Inspiration4

Non-astronaut personnel

Astronautics is the science behind going to space, and has been made possible beside the woman astronauts particularly by the many women who have been working in this and related fields.

To name some:
 Eilene Galloway
 Laurel van der Wal
 Katherine Johnson
 Mary Jackson
 Dorothy Vaughan
 Nichelle Nichols

A number of other high-profile women have contributed to interest in space programs. In the early 2000s, Lori Garver initiated a project to increase the visibility and viability of commercial spaceflight with the "AstroMom" project. She aimed to fill an unused Soyuz seat bound for the International Space Station because "…creating a spacefaring civilization was one of the most important things we could do in our lifetime."

See also

List of female astronauts
List of spaceflight records
List of space travelers by nationality
Maximum Absorbency Garment (NASA garment to help contain bodily emissions during spaceflight for men and women)
Mercury 13
List of female explorers and travelers
Human presence in space

References

External links
 Women in Space from Telegraph Jobs
 50 years of humans in space: European Women in Space (ESA)

Women in space
Astronauts
Human spaceflight